KPBI (1250 AM) is a radio station licensed to Fayetteville, Arkansas, United States, serving northwest Arkansas. The station is currently owned by Larry Morton, through licensee KTV Media, LLC.

History
On February 20, 1957, the Stamps Radio Broadcasting Company, owned by H. Weldon and Clifford L. Stamps, obtained a construction permit from the Federal Communications Commission to start a new 500-watt, daytime-only radio station in Fayetteville. Broadcasting from KFAY, the city's second outlet, began on June 30, 1957, with programming from the Mutual Broadcasting System and St. Louis Cardinals baseball. Weldon became the sole owner in 1959 and increased power to 1,000 watts during the day in 1961.

After building KFAY-FM 92.1 in 1965, Stamps sold the stations in 1966 to the Big Chief Broadcasting Company of Fayetteville.

The station (then known as KOFC) and its translator K277AZ were acquired by Media One Group from Bott Radio Network on October 2, 2017, at a purchase price of $125,000. The station changed its call sign to KRRD that same day.

The previous Red Dirt country format began to air on the higher-power KXRD on March 15, 2021, as Rox Radio Group sold KRRD and its translator to KTV Media, LLC for $300,000. The sale was consummated on May 14, 2021, with the call sign changing to KPBI the same day.

References

External links

PBI
Radio stations established in 1957
1957 establishments in Arkansas